Algoma West was a federal electoral district in Ontario, Canada, that was represented in the House of Commons of Canada from 1904 to 1968. It was created in 1903 from parts of Algoma riding.

The west riding of Algoma was defined to consist of the portion of the territorial district of Algoma lying west of Algoma East riding.

The electoral district was abolished in 1966 when it was redistributed between Algoma, Cochrane,
Sault Ste. Marie and Timmins—Chapleau ridings.
Algoma West was created in 1903 from Algoma, and was abolished in 1966 into Algoma and Sault Ste. Marie.

Members of Parliament

This riding elected the following members of the House of Commons of Canada:

Election results

|}

|}

|}

|}

|}

|}

|}

|}

|}

|}

|}

|}

|}

|}

|}

|}

|}

|}

External links
 Riding history from the Library of Parliament

Former federal electoral districts of Ontario